Crossfire is a card game for 2 or more people in which the aim is to win more rounds than your opponent. You can win rounds by getting the highest card above a neutral card.

Players and cards 
Two or more players, using a regular deck of 52 playing cards without the Jokers.

The Play

The Layout 
The dealer deals 5 cards face down to each player and places 1 face-up card (neutral card) between them. The rest of the deck is placed to one side.
     _   _   _   _   _
    |     | |     | |     | |     | |     |
    |     | |     | |     | |     | |     | Player 1 cards (face down)
    |     | |     | |     | |     | |     | 
     -----   -----   -----   -----   -----

                     _                          _
                    |     |                        |     |
                    |     | Neutral card (face up) |     | Rest of deck (face down)
                    |     |                        |     |
                     -----                          -----

     _   _   _   _   _
    |     | |     | |     | |     | |     |
    |     | |     | |     | |     | |     | Player 2 cards (face down)
    |     | |     | |     | |     | |     |
     -----   -----   -----   -----   -----

Gameplay 
Once the neutral card is on the field, the two players must choose (without looking at the faces) one of their face-down cards and put them (still face down) next to the neutral card. They then have to turn these cards over. 
 If any of the cards have a higher score (In ascending order: 2,3,4,5,6,7,8,9,10,J,Q,K,A) than the neutral card, then the highest card wins.
 If neither of the cards can beat the neutral card then all 3 cards are put aside on a discard pile.
 If any of the cards on the field are the same suit as another card, they switch places.
   _   _   _
  |  5  | |  A  | |  K  | 
  |Clubs| |Clubs| |Heart| Nobody can win (neutral card is highest)
  |     | |     | |     |
   -----   -----   -----
  <------------>
   These 2 are
   switched.
    _   _   _
   |  A  | |  5  | |  K  |
   |Clubs| |Clubs| |Heart| 1st player (left) wins because he/she has the highest card above
   |     | |     | |     | the neutral card's score, after the switch.
    -----   -----   -----
NOTE: This can be an advantage or a disadvantage for you. For example, if you have the highest card on the field - and the neutral card is the lowest - but also has the same suit as the neutral card they are swapped.
   _   _   _
  |  A  | |  2  | |  7  |
  |Spade| |Spade| | Dia | Player 1 (left) is winning
  |     | |     | |     |
   -----   -----   -----
  <----------->
  These are switched
   _   _   _
  |  2  | |  A  | |  7  |
  |Spade| |Spade| | Dia | Nobody has beaten the neutral card's score after the switch so this
  |     | |     | |     | is a draw.
   -----   -----   -----
If all the cards are the same suit they are moved one space to the right. Player 2's card is moved to Player 1's position because P2's card can't move any further right.
   <--------------------  
   _   _   _
  |  9  | |  J  | |  Q  |
  |Heart| |Heart| |Heart| Player 2 (right) is winning.
  |     | |     | |     |
   -----   -----   -----
  ---------------------->
   All cards are moved along
   
   _   _   _
  |  Q  | |  9  | |  J  |
  |Heart| |Heart| |Heart| Player 1 (left) wins because he/she has the highest card above the 
  |     | |     | |     | neutral card's score, after the switch.
   -----   -----   -----

 Once you have won a round you must keep one of the cards and put in a pile to keep a score of your winnings.

Ending the game 

 When all the cards from the deck have been used, you must use one of the players face down cards until all of one players cards have been used. This is when the game ends.
 You must count your scores and the person with the highest amount of winnings, wins the game.

See also
Crash (card game)

References

Comparing card games